Yucai (育才) may refer to:

 Duan Yucai (段玉裁; 1735–1815), Chinese philologist

Places
 Yucai, Hainan, town in Sanya
 Yucai Subdistrict, Shijiazhuang, in Chang'an District, Shijiazhuang, Hebei
 Yucai Subdistrict, Hegang, in Gongnong District, Hegang, Heilongjiang
 Yucai Road Subdistrict, Shizuishan, in Huinong District, Shizuishan, Ningxia
 Yucai Road Subdistrict, Suining, in Chuanshan District, Suining, Sichuan

Schools
 Yucai High School or "Yucai Middle School", various cities